Fernando Ospina Hernández (29 March 1929 – 15 December 2021) was a Colombian engineer and politician. A member of the Colombian Conservative Party, he served in the Chamber of Representatives of Colombia from 1982 to 1986. He died on 15 December 2021, at the age of 92.

References

1929 births
2021 deaths
Colombian Conservative Party politicians
Colombian engineers
Colombian politicians
Members of the Chamber of Representatives of Colombia
People from Medellín